The Spokesperson of the Government of Spain is a high ranking of the Government of Spain whose purpose is to inform and communicate to society the political and institutional action of the central government. Its headquarters is located in the denominated Complex of La Moncloa. Currently the holder of the position enjoys the rank of Minister.

History 
The need to inform public opinion about government actions began in 1918 with the creation of the Ministry of Public Instruction and Fine Arts which had an Information Office. With the dictatorship of Primo de Rivera two successive organisms are created; First, the Bureau of Information and Press Censorship, during the Military Directory (1923), and the next in the Civil Directory (1925) with the Office of Information and Press Censorship.

During the Second Republic was born the Press Section affected the General Secretary of the President of the Republic (1932) and during the civil war, Largo Caballero, the prime minister, created the Ministry of Propaganda that had an ephemeral life.

In Francoist Spain the Ministry of Information and Tourism (1951) was created, a ministerial department that was in charge of controlling information, press and radio. To this, was added the administration of Tourism, an industry that had a significant flourishing during those years.

The return to democracy demanded the communication to the citizens about the government's actions, reason why it became necessary the appearance of the figure of the spokesperson. Following the Ministry of Information and Tourism, the next link in the chain of the Spanish Communicative Administration, is the Office of Information Services, created in October 1977 within the Presidency of the Government.

In 1982, with the arrival of PSOE to the power, the Office of the Spokesperson of the Government directed by Eduardo Sotillos is created. In 1985, he is replaced by Javier Solana, Minister of Culture, who will alternate both responsibilities. Nevertheless, in 1988, the prime minister, Felipe González, decides to elevate the Office to rank of Ministry. Rosa Conde was appointed Minister-Spokesperson.

With her resignation in 1993, the position was assumed by the Minister of the Presidency, Alfredo Pérez Rubalcaba. With the arrival to power of the People's Party, the position returns to have the same category that in 1985, assuming the position other Cabinet members, with the exception of the period from 2000 to 2003 in which it was again and independent position. It was later linked to the Ministry of the Presidency.

Since 2004, the Government Spokesperson has been assumed by the Vicepresident, except between 2009 and 2011 that was directed by the Minister of Public Works.

In 2016, this position was conferred on the Minister of Education, Culture and Sport, Íñigo Méndez de Vigo.

In 2018, after the Motion of no confidence, Isabel Celaá became the new Spokesperson of the Government of Spain. She was also named Minister of Education and Vocational Training.

List of Spokesperson of the Government of Spain

Second Spanish Republic

Francoist Spain

Juan Carlos I

Felipe VI 

(1) Minister of Propaganda
(2) Secretary of State for Information (1977-1981), Secretary of State of Communication (1981-1982).
(3) He combined it with the position of Minister of Culture (December 3, 1982 - 7 de July 7, 1988).
(4) Spokesperson Minister of the Government
(5) Minister of the Presidency.
(6) Secretary of State of Communication, acted as Spokesperson de facto of the Government.
(7) He combined it with the position of Minister of Industry and Energy (May 6, 1996 - April 27, 2000).
(8) He combined it with the position of Employment and Social Affairs (July 10, 2002 - April 17, 2004).
(9) She combined it with the position of Vicepresident, Minister of the Presidency and Spokesperson of the Government.
(10) She combined it with the position of Vicepresident and Spokesperson of the Government.
(11) He combined it with the position of Minister of Public Works (April 7, 2009 - December 21, 2011).
(12) He combined it with the position of Minister of Education, Culture and Sport.
(13) She combined it with the position of Minister of Education and Vocational training.
(14) She combined it with the position of Minister of Finance.
(15) She combined it with the position of Minister of Territorial Policy.

References

Government of Spain
Politics of Spain
Government ministries of Spain
Spanish Prime Minister's Office